Prim Intawong (born ) (former name Prim Jitwises) is a Thai female volleyball player. She was part of the Thailand women's national volleyball team.

She participated in the 2004 FIVB Volleyball World Grand Prix.
On club level, she played for Aerothai, Bangkok, Thailand in 2004.

Clubs
  Thai Namthip VC (1989)
  Aerothai (2004)

References

External links
 FIVB Profile

1970 births
Living people
Prim Intawong
Place of birth missing (living people)
Southeast Asian Games medalists in volleyball
Prim Intawong
Prim Intawong
Competitors at the 1989 Southeast Asian Games
Competitors at the 1991 Southeast Asian Games
Competitors at the 1993 Southeast Asian Games
Competitors at the 1995 Southeast Asian Games
Competitors at the 1997 Southeast Asian Games
Competitors at the 2001 Southeast Asian Games
Competitors at the 2003 Southeast Asian Games
Prim Intawong
Prim Intawong
Prim Intawong